is a TV station of Nippon News Network (NNN) and Nippon Television Network System (NNS) in Hokkaidō, Japan. Headquartered in Sapporo, the capital city of Hokkaidō prefecture, the TV station was established on April 8, 1958. It is usually called "STV" for short, which is used as a name in a number of TV programs.

Currently, the STV Radio is a radio station of National Radio Network (NRN) in Hokkaidō, Japan. The license of the radio broadcasting was succeeded to the STV Radio, and started radio broadcasting on October 1, 2005.

History

Early stages 
In early 1957, Youzo Kurosawa (then president of the Hokkai Shimbun), Yoshjiro Kikuchi (then president of the Hokkaido Charcoal Steamship Company), and Yoshitaro Hagiwara (president of the Hokkaido Charcoal Steamship Company), considered the formation of a second private television station in Hokkaido. Japan's national newspapers (Yomiuri Shimbun, Asahi Shimbun, Mainichi Shimbun, and Sankei Shimbun) attempted to enter the Hokkaido market at the time by combining two major sectors, television and newspapers, with the goal of creating a private television station.

This is unquestionably a serious danger to Hokkaido's native newspaper, the Hokkai Shimbun. Hokkai Shimbun and an unnamed Hokkaido firm sought for a commercial TV broadcasting license under the name "Sapporo TV" in April 1957. And received their license on October of the same year.

Founding and early years 

The company was founded on April 8, 1958.STV began its TV broadcasts on April 1 the following year airing for at least 9 hours a day.  STV started as a dual affiliated station with NNN as their primary affiliate and FNN as their secondary affiliate. The network also aired certain programming from Nippon Educational Television (currently TV Asahi) alongside HBC.

Prior to its official TV broadcasts, STV also applied a radio broadcasting license in 1958 (which was later rejected). The broadcaster applied for a license again on February 17, 1961 and was granted on July 10, 1962 becoming the only broadcaster in Japan to start TV broadcasts then radio broadcasts (STV Radio started broadcasting on December 15, 1962). Nippon Educational Programs stopped providing programs to STV after it moved remaining programs to HBC sometime in 1962. On March 20, 1966, STV started to air programs in color. STV joined NNN as one of its founding members on April 1, 1966. 

In 1972, Sapporo TV also assisted in broadcasting the Sapporo Winter Olympics. STV ended airing programs from Fuji TV/FNN after UHB started broadcasting on April 1, 1972. Sapporo TV started was the first broadcaster to use the automatic advertising broadcast system. In 1993, STV ranked number 1 in TV ratings for the first time. In 1998, the 40th anniversary of the network, the network opened its NNN bureau in Berlin (later closed in 2005 and opened a news bureau in Moscow on the same year instead).

2000s 
On April 7, 2000, the Sapporo Media Park "Spica" invested by the network officially opened, becoming an important cultural base in Sapporo. However, due to continued losses, STV withdrew from operating Spica in 2007 (parts of the Spica building was later demolished by the following year) . Since 2003, STV was number 1 in TV ratings. On July 13, 2005, STV separated its radio operations into a wholly owned subsidiary, STV Radio.

On June 1, 2006, STV started digital broadcasting (which expanded its digital relay stations in its sub-prefectures by the following year) . Analog broadcasting then ended on July 24, 2011. As of 2019, STV has been number 1 in TV ratings for 12 years, with its all-day ratings also number 1 for 27 years since 1993 continuing to set the longest record in Japan.

Technical Information

Programs

STV
 Dosanko Wide
 Dosanko Sunday
 Bakushou Mondai no SUSUME
 ippachi ikouyo!

STV Radio
 OHAYO!! HOKKAIDO
 Attack Young(end)
 AtaYoun PUSH!
 Weekend Variety Goro-Hidaka Show (every Saturday)
 All Night Nippon (from Nippon Broadcasting System, Incorporated (LF))
All Night Nippon (Mon. - Sat. 25:00 - 27:00)
All Night Nippon Ever Green (Mon. - Thu. 27:00 - 29:00)
All Night Nippon R (Fri. 27:00 - 29:00, Sat. 27:00 - 28:30)
All Night Nippon Record (Sat. 28:30 - 29:00, not including LF)

Rival
Hokkaido Broadcasting Co.
Hokkaido Television Broadcasting Co.
Hokkaido Cultural Broadcasting Co
TV Hokkaido Co.

References

External links
 Sapporo Television Broadcasting HomePage
 STV Radio HomePage

STV Radio
Television stations in Japan
Nippon News Network
Mass media in Sapporo
Television channels and stations established in 1958
1958 establishments in Japan